Alexander Chuprov may refer to:

 Alexander Ivanovich Chuprov (1841–1908), Russian professor of political economy and statistics at Moscow University
 Alexander Alexandrovich Chuprov (1874–1926), his son, Russian statistician and professor at the St. Petersburg Polytechnical Institute